John Christie Cooper (23 August 1908 – 25 June 1940) was a Scottish amateur footballer who played in the Scottish League for Queen's Park as a left back. He was capped by Scotland at amateur level.

References 

Association football fullbacks
Scottish footballers
Queen's Park F.C. players
Scottish Football League players
Scotland amateur international footballers
1908 births
1940 deaths
People from Cathcart
Footballers from Glasgow